Cara Spencer is an American politician from the state of Missouri.  She has served on the Board of Aldermen of the City of St. Louis representing Ward 20 since 2015.  Spencer ran in the 2021 St. Louis mayoral election, finishing as a top-two candidate in the primary election.  She lost in the general election to Tishaura Jones.

Early life and education 

Spencer grew up in South St. Louis City and St. Louis County. She earned a Bachelor of Science degree in mathematics from Truman State University.

Prior to becoming an elected official, Spencer did mathematical modeling for the St. Louis-based company Tessellon.

Politics 
Spencer has served on the Board of Aldermen of the City of St. Louis and ran for mayor in 2021 St. Louis mayoral election. In her role as Alderwoman, Spencer represents Ward 20, which is located in South St. Louis and includes the neighborhoods of Dutchtown, Gravois Park, Marine Villa, and Mount Pleasant.

Board of Aldermen 
Spencer was first elected to the Board of Aldermen of the City of St. Louis in April 2015 after defeating incumbent Craig Schmid, who had held the seat for two decades, in the Democratic primary election. She then defeated independent candidate Stephen Jehle and Green Party candidate Vickie Ingram in the general election. Spencer was re-elected in 2019.

During her first term in office she was the primary sponsor of legislation which; enacted stricter campaign finance laws, imposed stricter air pollution standards than state requirements on asbestos in demolitions, required absentee landlords to pay fines for building code violations, imposed fines on payday lending operators, and protects victims of drug overdose by enacting the 1st municipal good Samaritan law in the US, granting immunity to drug possession charges to anyone calling 911 for help during an overdose.  Spencer co-developed and helped implement the "mow-to-own" program allowing residents to obtain an adjacent city-owned lot by mowing it for one year. Spencer helped stop the St. Louis Lambert International Airport from being privatized.

In 2016, an ethics complaint was filed against Spencer by attorney Jane Dueker, alleging that Spencer failed to disclose a personal financial interest related to legislation she introduced regulating payday lending. The case was dismissed. In August 2020, Spencer was the target of a petition to recall her from her position as Alderwoman. The petition was organized by Metropolitan Strategies and Solution, a consulting firm that supported privatization efforts.

Spencer serves as the chair of the aldermanic Health and Human Services Committee for the city of St. Louis.

2021 St. Louis mayoral election 

On January 13, 2020, Spencer announced her intention to run for mayor of St. Louis in 2021. The 2021 election will be the city's first to use approval voting. Spencer, along with Board of Aldermen President Lewis Reed, were endorsed by the St. Louis Post-Dispatch Editorial Board in a joint endorsement (since voters could now select more than one candidate in the primary election). Spencer was also endorsed by the Planned Parenthood Advocates of the St. Louis Region and Southwest Missouri and former St. Louis Mayor Vincent C. Schoemehl.

Spencer, alongside St. Louis Treasurer Tishaura Jones, advanced to the general election after the primary on March 2, 2021. Spencer was defeated by Jones in the general election held on April 6, 2021.

References

External links
 

21st-century American politicians
21st-century American women politicians
Living people
Members of the St. Louis Board of Aldermen
Missouri Democrats
Truman State University alumni
Women city councillors in Missouri
Year of birth missing (living people)